N40 may refer to:

Roads
 N40 road (Ireland)
 N-40 National Highway in Pakistan
 Nebraska Highway 40, in the United States

Other
 N40 (Long Island bus)
 Benign prostatic hyperplasia
 BMW N40, an automobile engine
 Naughty Forty, a football hooligan firm linked to Stoke City F.C.
 Sky Manor Airport (New Jersey), in Hunterdon County, New Jersey, United States
 Toyota Hilux (N40), a Japanese pickup truck
 IBM RISC System/6000 N40, a laptop; see IBM RS/6000 § Type 7007